Corticata ("one with a cortex"), in the classification of eukaryotes (living organisms with a cell nucleus), is a clade suggested by Thomas Cavalier-Smith 
to encompass the eukaryote supergroups of the following two groups:
 Plantae, or Archaeplastida (plants, red algae, green algae, and glaucophytes) 
 Chromalveolata (a group including kelp, water moulds, ciliates, dinoflagellates, and other organisms)

Cavalier-Smith currently includes Rhizaria as well, resulting in an equivalency to Diaphoretickes.

See also
Bikont
Cabozoa

References 

Bikont unranked clades
Diaphoretickes